The 2008–09 San Antonio Spurs season was the 42nd season of the franchise and the 33rd in the National Basketball Association (NBA).

In the playoffs, the Spurs lost to the Dallas Mavericks in five games in the First Round.

Key dates
June 26: The 2008 NBA draft took place in New York City.
July 1: The free agency period started.

Offseason

Draft picks

Roster

Regular season

Standings

Game log

|- bgcolor="#ffcccc"
| 1
| October 29
| Phoenix
| 
| Tony Parker, Tim Duncan (32)
| Matt Bonner, Kurt Thomas (7)
| Tony Parker (5)
| AT&T Center18,797
| 0–1
|- bgcolor="#ffcccc"
| 2
| October 31
| @ Portland
| 
| Tim Duncan (27)
| Tim Duncan (10)
| Tony Parker (11)
| Rose Garden20,516
| 0–2

|- bgcolor="#ffcccc"
| 3
| November 4
| Dallas
| 
| Tony Parker (22)
| Tim Duncan (15)
| Tony Parker (3)
| AT&T Center17,398
| 0–3
|- bgcolor="#bbffbb"
| 4
| November 5
| @ Minnesota
| 
| Tony Parker (55)
| Tim Duncan (16)
| Tony Parker (10)
| Target Center11,112
| 1–3
|- bgcolor="#ffcccc"
| 5
| November 7
| Miami
| 
| Tim Duncan (22)
| Tim Duncan (11)
| Roger Mason (6)
| AT&T Center17,387
| 1–4
|- bgcolor="#bbffbb"
| 6
| November 11
| New York
| 
| Tim Duncan (23)
| Tim Duncan, Fabricio Oberto (9)
| Tim Duncan (7)
| AT&T Center16,569
| 2–4
|- bgcolor="#ffcccc"
| 7
| November 12
| @ Milwaukee
| 
| Tim Duncan (24)
| Anthony Tolliver (6)
| Jacque Vaughn (6)
| Bradley Center14,036
| 2–5
|- bgcolor="#bbffbb"
| 8
| November 14
| Houston
| 
| Tim Duncan (22)
| Roger Mason (9)
| George Hill (5)
| AT&T Center18,797
| 3–5
|- bgcolor="#bbffbb"
| 9
| November 16
| @ Sacramento
| 
| Michael Finley (21)
| Tim Duncan (10)
| Jacque Vaughn (6)
| ARCO Arena11,699
| 4–5
|- bgcolor="#bbffbb"
| 10
| November 17
| @ L.A. Clippers
| 
| Roger Mason (21)
| Tim Duncan (15)
| George Hill (8)
| Staples Center14,962
| 5–5
|- bgcolor="#ffcccc"
| 11
| November 19
| Denver
| 
| George Hill (20)
| Tim Duncan (11)
| Tim Duncan (6)
| AT&T Center16,559
| 5–6
|- bgcolor="#bbffbb"
| 12
| November 21
| Utah
| 
| Roger Mason (29)
| Tim Duncan (7)
| George Hill, Tim Duncan, Bruce Bowen (4)
| AT&T Center17,354
| 6–6
|- bgcolor="#bbffbb"
| 13
| November 24
| @ Memphis
| 
| George Hill (20)
| Tim Duncan (11)
| George Hill, Roger Mason, Michael Finley, Fabricio Oberto (3)
| FedExForum12,053
| 7–6
|- bgcolor="#bbffbb"
| 14
| November 26
| Chicago
| 
| Tim Duncan (21)
| George Hill (11)
| George Hill, Manu Ginóbili (4)
| AT&T Center17,837
| 8–6
|- bgcolor="#bbffbb"
| 15
| November 28
| Memphis
| 
| Roger Mason (20)
| Tim Duncan (12)
| Tony Parker, George Hill (7)
| AT&T Center17,074
| 9–6
|- bgcolor="#ffcccc"
| 16
| November 29
| @ Houston
| 
| Tim Duncan, Matt Bonner (17)
| Tim Duncan (9)
| Tony Parker (7)
| Toyota Center18,282
| 9–7

|- bgcolor="#ffcccc"
| 17
| December 2
| Detroit
| 
| Tim Duncan (23)
| Tim Duncan (13)
| Tony Parker (5)
| AT&T Center17,582
| 9–8
|- bgcolor="#bbffbb"
| 18
| December 4
| @ Denver
| 
| Tony Parker (22)
| Tim Duncan (12)
| Tony Parker (8)
| Pepsi Center15,866
| 10–8
|- bgcolor="#bbffbb"
| 19
| December 6
| Golden State
| 
| Tim Duncan (20)
| Tim Duncan (13)
| Tony Parker (8)
| AT&T Center17,740
| 11–8
|- bgcolor="#bbffbb"
| 20
| December 9
| @ Dallas
| 
| Tim Duncan (32)
| Tim Duncan (14)
| Tony Parker (10)
| American Airlines Center19,937
| 12–8
|- bgcolor="#bbffbb"
| 21
| December 10
| Atlanta
| 
| Manu Ginóbili (27)
| Matt Bonner (13)
| George Hill (5)
| AT&T Center18,161
| 13–8
|- bgcolor="#bbffbb"
| 22
| December 12
| @ Minnesota
| 
| Tony Parker, Tim Duncan (17)
| Tim Duncan (13)
| Tony Parker (9)
| Target Center15,336
| 14–8
|- bgcolor="#bbffbb"
| 23
| December 14
| Oklahoma City
| 
| Tony Parker (22)
| Tim Duncan (12)
| Tony Parker (7)
| AT&T Center17,419
| 15–8
|- bgcolor="#ffcccc"
| 24
| December 17
| @ New Orleans
| 
| Tony Parker (20)
| Tim Duncan (11)
| Manu Ginóbili (5)
| New Orleans Arena16,593
| 15–9
|- bgcolor="#ffcccc"
| 25
| December 18
| @ Orlando
| 
| Tim Duncan (19)
| Tim Duncan (9)
| Tony Parker (4)
| Amway Arena17,461
| 15–10
|- bgcolor="#bbffbb"
| 26
| December 20
| Toronto
| 
| Tony Parker (24)
| Kurt Thomas (12)
| Tony Parker (10)
| AT&T Center17,227
| 16–10
|- bgcolor="#bbffbb"
| 27
| December 22
| Sacramento
| 
| Tony Parker (18)
| Kurt Thomas (7)
| Tony Parker (6)
| AT&T Center18,372
| 17–10
|- bgcolor="#bbffbb"
| 28
| December 23
| Minnesota
| 
| Tony Parker (36)
| Tim Duncan (12)
| Tony Parker (8)
| AT&T Center17,996
| 18–10
|- bgcolor="#bbffbb"
| 29
| December 25
| @ Phoenix
| 
| Tony Parker (27)
| Tim Duncan (17)
| Tony Parker (8)
| US Airways Center18,422
| 19–10
|- bgcolor="#bbffbb"
| 30
| December 27
| Memphis
| 
| Tony Parker (32)
| Michael Finley, Bruce Bowen (6)
| Tony Parker, Michael Finley (5)
| AT&T Center18,797
| 20–10
|- bgcolor="#ffcccc"
| 31
| December 30
| Milwaukee
| 
| Tim Duncan (22)
| Tim Duncan (6)
| Tony Parker (10)
| AT&T Center18,797
| 20–11

|- bgcolor="#bbffbb"
| 32
| January 2
| @ Memphis
| 
| Tim Duncan (20)
| Tim Duncan (10)
| Manu Ginóbili (6)
| FedExForum12,597
| 21–11
|- bgcolor="#bbffbb"
| 33
| January 3
| Philadelphia
| 
| Tim Duncan (26)
| Tim Duncan (12)
| Tony Parker (10)
| AT&T Center18,797
| 22–11
|- bgcolor="#bbffbb"
| 34
| January 5
| @ Miami
| 
| Tim Duncan (19)
| Tim Duncan (9)
| Tony Parker (7)
| American Airlines Arena19,600
| 23–11
|- bgcolor="#bbffbb"
| 35
| January 8
| L.A. Clippers
| 
| Tony Parker (19)
| Kurt Thomas (9)
| Tim Duncan (9)
| AT&T Center17,873
| 24–11
|- bgcolor="#ffcccc"
| 36
| January 11
| Orlando
| 
| Tony Parker (31)
| Tim Duncan (10)
| Tony Parker (6)
| AT&T Center18,216
| 24–12
|- bgcolor="#bbffbb"
| 37
| January 14
| L.A. Lakers
| 
| Manu Ginóbili (27)
| Tim Duncan (10)
| Tim Duncan (8)
| AT&T Center18,797
| 25–12
|- bgcolor="#ffcccc"
| 38
| January 16
| @ Philadelphia
| 
| Tim Duncan (20)
| Tim Duncan (12)
| Tony Parker (6)
| Wachovia Center18,739
| 25–13
|- bgcolor="#bbffbb"
| 39
| January 17
| @ Chicago
| 
| Manu Ginóbili (21)
| Tim Duncan (14)
| Tony Parker (8)
| United Center22,100
| 26–13
|- bgcolor="#bbffbb"
| 40
| January 19
| @ Charlotte
| 
| Tim Duncan (17)
| Tim Duncan (11)
| Tony Parker (10)
| Time Warner Cable Arena16,160
| 27–13
|- bgcolor="#bbffbb"
| 41
| January 20
| Indiana
| 
| Tim Duncan (27)
| Tim Duncan (10)
| Tony Parker (7)
| AT&T Center18,181
| 28–13
|- bgcolor="#bbffbb"
| 42
| January 23
| New Jersey
| 
| Tim Duncan (30)
| Tim Duncan (15)
| Tim Duncan (5)
| AT&T Center18,797
| 29–13
|- bgcolor="#ffcccc"
| 43
| January 25
| @ L.A. Lakers
| 
| Tony Parker (19)
| Tim Duncan, Manu Ginóbili (8)
| Tony Parker (6)
| Staples Center18,997
| 29–14
|- bgcolor="#bbffbb"
| 44
| January 27
| @ Utah
| 
| Tony Parker, Tim Duncan (24)
| Manu Ginóbili, Tim Duncan (9)
| Tim Duncan (8)
| EnergySolutions Arena19,911
| 30–14
|- bgcolor="#bbffbb"
| 45
| January 29
| @ Phoenix
| 
| Manu Ginóbili (30)
| Tim Duncan (15)
| Tony Parker (5)
| US Airways Center18,422
| 31–14
|- bgcolor="#bbffbb"
| 46
| January 31
| New Orleans
| 
| Tony Parker (25)
| Tim Duncan (8)
| Tony Parker, Tim Duncan (7)
| AT&T Center18,797
| 32–14

|- bgcolor="#bbffbb"
| 47
| February 2
| @ Golden State
| 
| Manu Ginóbili, Tim Duncan (32)
| Kurt Thomas, Tim Duncan (15)
| Tony Parker (7)
| Oracle Arena18,205
| 33–14
|- bgcolor="#ffcccc"
| 48
| February 3
| @ Denver
| 
| Roger Mason (26)
| Matt Bonner (8)
| Roger Mason (6)
| Pepsi Center18,536
| 33–15
|- bgcolor="#bbffbb"
| 49
| February 8
| @ Boston
| 
| Tim Duncan, Matt Bonner (23)
| Tim Duncan (13)
| Tony Parker (7)
| TD Banknorth Garden18,624
| 34–15
|- bgcolor="#bbffbb"
| 50
| February 10
| @ New Jersey
| 
| Tim Duncan (27)
| Tim Duncan (9)
| Tim Duncan (8)
| Izod Center13,301
| 35–15
|- bgcolor="#ffcccc"
| 51
| February 11
| @ Toronto
| 
| Manu Ginóbili (32)
| Tim Duncan (13)
| Tim Duncan (7)
| Air Canada Centre18,909
| 35–16
|- align="center"
|colspan="9" bgcolor="#bbcaff"|All-Star Break
|- bgcolor="#ffcccc"
| 52
| February 17
| @ New York
| 
| Tim Duncan (26)
| Tim Duncan (15)
| Tony Parker (7)
| Madison Square Garden19,763
| 35–17
|- bgcolor="#bbffbb"
| 53
| February 19
| @ Detroit
| 
| Tony Parker (19)
| Tim Duncan (18)
| Tony Parker (11)
| The Palace of Auburn Hills22,076
| 36–17
|- bgcolor="#bbffbb"
| 54
| February 21
| @ Washington
| 
| Roger Mason (25)
| Tim Duncan (11)
| George Hill (6)
| Verizon Center20,173
| 37–17
|- bgcolor="#bbffbb"
| 55
| February 24
| Dallas
| 
| Tony Parker (37)
| Kurt Thomas (15)
| Tony Parker (12)
| AT&T Center18,797
| 38–17
|- bgcolor="#bbffbb"
| 56
| February 25
| Portland
| 
| Tony Parker (39)
| Kurt Thomas (10)
| Tony Parker (9)
| AT&T Center18,672
| 39–17
|- bgcolor="#ffcccc"
| 57
| February 27
| Cleveland
| 
| Pops Mensah-Bonsu, Malik Hairston, Tony Parker, Michael Finley (11)
| Michael Finley (7)
| Tony Parker (6)
| AT&T Center18,797
| 39–18

|- bgcolor="#ffcccc"
| 58
| March 1
| @ Portland
| 
| Tony Parker (15)
| Fabricio Oberto (6)
| George Hill, Tony Parker (4)
| Rose Garden20,627
| 39–19
|- bgcolor="#bbffbb"
| 59
| March 2
| @ L.A. Clippers
| 
| Tony Parker (26)
| Tim Duncan (12)
| Tony Parker (10)
| Staples Center17,649
| 40–19
|- bgcolor="#ffcccc"
| 60
| March 4
| @ Dallas
| 
| Tony Parker (37)
| Tim Duncan (12)
| Tim Duncan (5)
| American Airlines Center20,316
| 40–20
|- bgcolor="#bbffbb"
| 61
| March 6
| Washington
| 
| Tony Parker (19)
| Kurt Thomas (7)
| Tony Parker (7)
| AT&T Center18,440
| 41–20
|- bgcolor="#bbffbb"
| 62
| March 8
| Phoenix
| 
| Tony Parker (30)
| Tim Duncan (15)
| Tony Parker (9)
| AT&T Center18,797
| 42–20
|- bgcolor="#bbffbb"
| 63
| March 10
| Charlotte
| 
| Roger Mason, Tony Parker (21)
| Tim Duncan (11)
| Tony Parker (7)
| AT&T Center18,254
| 43–20
|- bgcolor="#ffcccc"
| 64
| March 12
| L.A. Lakers
| 
| Michael Finley, Tony Parker (25)
| Tim Duncan (11)
| Tony Parker (9)
| AT&T Center18,797
| 43–21
|- bgcolor="#bbffbb"
| 65
| March 14
| @ Houston
| 
| Tony Parker (28)
| Tim Duncan (12)
| Tony Parker (8)
| Toyota Center18,300
| 44–21
|- bgcolor="#ffcccc"
| 66
| March 16
| @ Oklahoma City
| 
| Tony Parker (28)
| Tim Duncan (12)
| Tony Parker (7)
| Ford Center19,136
| 44–22
|- bgcolor="#bbffbb"
| 67
| March 17
| Minnesota
| 
| Tony Parker (24)
| Kurt Thomas (10)
| Tony Parker, Kurt Thomas (6)
| AT&T Center18,797
| 45–22
|- bgcolor="#ffcccc"
| 68
| March 20
| Boston
| 
| Tony Parker (25)
| Tim Duncan (9)
| Tony Parker (8)
| AT&T Center18,797
| 45–23
|- bgcolor="#ffcccc"
| 69
| March 22
| Houston
| 
| Tim Duncan (23)
| Kurt Thomas (9)
| Tony Parker (12)
| AT&T Center18,797
| 45–24
|- bgcolor="#bbffbb"
| 70
| March 24
| Golden State
| 
| Tony Parker (30)
| Tim Duncan (10)
| Tony Parker (10)
| AT&T Center18,797
| 46–24
|- bgcolor="#bbffbb"
| 71
| March 25
| @ Atlanta
| 
| Tony Parker (42)
| Kurt Thomas (8)
| Tony Parker (10)
| Philips Arena18,529
| 47–24
|- bgcolor="#bbffbb"
| 72
| March 27
| L.A. Clippers
| 
| Tony Parker (18)
| Roger Mason (8)
| Manu Ginóbili (7)
| AT&T Center18,797
| 48–24
|- bgcolor="#ffcccc"
| 73
| March 29
| @ New Orleans
| 
| Tony Parker (20)
| Tim Duncan (15)
| Tony Parker (7)
| New Orleans Arena18,204
| 48–25
|- bgcolor="#ffcccc"
| 74
| March 31
| Oklahoma City
| 
| Tim Duncan (21)
| Tim Duncan (12)
| Tim Duncan, Michael Finley, Tony Parker (4)
| AT&T Center18,797
| 48–26

|- bgcolor="#bbffbb"
| 75
| April 3
| @ Indiana
| 
| Tony Parker (31)
| Tim Duncan (11)
| Tony Parker (10)
| Conseco Fieldhouse16,414
| 49–26
|- bgcolor="#ffcccc"
| 76
| April 5
| @ Cleveland
| 
| Tony Parker (24)
| Kurt Thomas (9)
| Tony Parker, Manu Ginóbili (4)
| Quicken Loans Arena20,562
| 49–27
|- bgcolor="#bbffbb"
| 77
| April 7
| @ Oklahoma City
| 
| Tim Duncan (25)
| Tim Duncan (15)
| Tony Parker (10)
| Ford Center19,136
| 50–27
|- bgcolor="#ffcccc"
| 78
| April 8
| Portland
| 
| Roger Mason (18)
| Tony Parker, Kurt Thomas, Tim Duncan (5)
| Tony Parker (7)
| AT&T Center18,797
| 50–28
|- bgcolor="#bbffbb"
| 79
| April 10
| Utah
| 
| Tony Parker (31)
| Tim Duncan (9)
| Tony Parker (7)
| AT&T Center18,797
| 51–28
|- bgcolor="#bbffbb"
| 80
| April 12
| @ Sacramento
| 
| Tony Parker (25)
| Kurt Thomas (13)
| Tony Parker (9)
| ARCO Arena13,330
| 52–28
|- bgcolor="#bbffbb"
| 81
| April 13
| @ Golden State
| 
| Drew Gooden (20)
| Drew Gooden (15)
| Tim Duncan, Michael Finley (4)
| Oracle Arena19,596
| 53–28
|- bgcolor="#bbffbb"
| 82
| April 15
| New Orleans
| 
| Tony Parker (29)
| Tim Duncan (19)
| Duncan, Parker (6)
| AT&T Center18,797
| 54–28

Playoffs

|- bgcolor="#ffcccc"
| 1
| April 18
| Dallas
| 
| Tim Duncan (27)
| Tim Duncan (9)
| Tony Parker (8)
| AT&T Center18,797
| 0–1
|- bgcolor="#bbffbb"
| 2
| April 20
| Dallas
| 
| Tony Parker (38)
| Tim Duncan (11)
| Tony Parker (8)
| AT&T Center18,797
| 1–1
|- bgcolor="#ffcccc"
| 3
| April 23
| @ Dallas
| 
| Tony Parker (12)
| Kurt Thomas (10)
| Tony Parker (3)
| American Airlines Center20,491
| 1–2
|- bgcolor="#ffcccc"
| 4
| April 25
| @ Dallas
| 
| Tony Parker (43)
| Tim Duncan (10)
| Tim Duncan (7)
| American Airlines Center20,829
| 1–3
|- bgcolor="#ffcccc"
| 5
| April 28
| Dallas
| 
| Tim Duncan (31)
| Tim Duncan (12)
| Tony Parker (6)
| AT&T Center20,829
| 1–4

Player statistics

Season

Playoffs
The Spurs were eliminated in the first round of the playoffs by the Dallas Mavericks.

Awards and records

Awards
Tim Duncan: 2009 All-NBA Second Team
Tony Parker: 2009 Third-team All-NBA
Tim Duncan: 2009 NBA All-Defensive Second Team

Records
Tim Duncan became the first player in NBA history to be an All-NBA selection in his first twelve seasons.  Duncan is one of only eight players in the history of the league to be selected twelve times.

Transactions

Trades

Free agents

Additions

Subtractions

See also
2008–09 NBA season

References

San Antonio Spurs seasons
2008–09 NBA season by team
San Antonio
San Antonio